Art Alive! is a paint program released by Sega for the Sega Mega Drive and Sega Genesis in 1991.

Gameplay
Its features include stamps of Sonic the Hedgehog, ToeJam & Earl, and other Sega characters. It was followed by Sega's Wacky Worlds Creativity Studio in 1994.

Reception
Entertainment Weekly gave the game a C+ and wrote that "More of a toy than a game, Sega's draw-and-paint program is pretty colorless compared with what you can accomplish on some mid-range personal computers, but it's still a welcome alternative to those burnt out on mindless shoot-'em-ups."

See also 
Mario Paint

References

External links 

 Reviews on SegaRetro

1991 video games
Children's educational video games
Drawing video games
Raster graphics editors
Sega Genesis games
Sega Genesis-only games
Sega video games
Single-player video games
Video games developed in the United States